Tripoli Sporting Club, also known as AC Tripoli or simply Tripoli, is a football club based in Tripoli, Lebanon, that competes in the .

Founded as Al Majd Sports Association, the club was renamed Olympic Beirut Sporting Club in 2001, winning the domestic double in the 2002–03 season. In 2005 they were re-established as AC Tripoli, and won a Lebanese FA Cup in 2014–15.

History

Olympic Beirut 
Founded as Al Majd Sports Association, the club was renamed Olympic Beirut Sporting Club on 4 April 2001, by Taha Koleilat. In 2001–02 the club won the Lebanese Second Division, and were promoted to the Lebanese Premier League. Koleilat allocated a budget of USD$7 million, with the goal of winning the league and building a competitive team for the AFC Cup. Having strengthened the team with the signings of Pierre Issa, Edílson, Faisal Antar, Youssef Mohamad, and Abbas Ali Atwi, among others, Olympic Beirut won the domestic double in 2002–03, winning both the league and FA Cup.

The decline was felt the following season, in 2003–04, with Olympic Beirut being knocked out of the 2004 AFC Cup in the quarter-finals against Singaporean club Home United, and finishing the league in third place. In 2004–05 Olympic Beirut finished in fourth place.

AC Tripoli 
Prior to the 2005–06 season, Koleilat sold the club's license to former national team player Walid Kamareddine for $400,000, with the club being relocated to Tripoli. The club was first renamed Olympic, then Olympic Tripoli, and finally AC Tripoli. The Lebanese Football Association (LFA) approved of the move on 24 November 2005.

In 2014–15 Tripoli won the Lebanese FA Cup, their first trophy under their new name. They participated in the 2016 AFC Cup where, after beating Kyrgyz club Alay Osh in the qualifying play-offs on penalty shoot-outs, they qualified to the group stage. Drawn in group B, Tripoli finished in third place out of four with two wins, a draw, and three defeats.

Starting from the 2016–17 season, Tripoli found themselves in financial issues due to Najib Mikati, the club's main funder, deciding to cut the club's salary year by year, leaving the club to rely on social donations and TV sponsorship payments.

Club rivalries
Tripoli plays the Tripoli derby with Egtmaaey, as they are both located in the same city. The club also contests the North derby with Salam Zgharta, also on the basis of location.

Players

Current squad

Honours
 Lebanese Premier League
 Winners (1): 2002–03
 Lebanese FA Cup
 Winners (2): 2002–03, 2014–15
 Runners-up (2): 2004–05, 2013–14
Lebanese Second Division
 Winners (2): 2001–02, 2010–11
Lebanese Challenge Cup
 Runners-up (1): 2021
Lebanese Super Cup
Runners-up (1): 2015

Performance in AFC competitions
 AFC Cup: 2 appearances
2004: Quarter-finals
2016: Group stage

Managerial history

 Ihsan Sayeed (1999–2002)
 Estevam Soares (2002)
 Mohammed Sahel (2002–2004)
 Vardan Ghazaryan (2017)
 Fadi Ayad (2018–2019)
 Ismael Kortam (2019)
 Ahmad Hafez (2019–2020)
 Ismael Kortam (2020)
 Salim Mikati (2018–2021)
 Saad Jameel (2021–present)

See also 
 List of football clubs in Lebanon

Notes

References

External links

 AC Tripoli at the AFC
 AC Tripoli at LebanonFG

 
Football clubs in Lebanon
2001 establishments in Lebanon
Association football clubs established in 2001
Association football clubs established in 2005